Sator may refer to:

 Sator (lizard), a genus of lizard
 Sator Square (or Rotas Square), a first-century word square containing a five-word Latin palindrome
 Šator, a mountain in Bosnia and Herzegovina
 Sator (the "Sower"), a minor Roman agricultural deity or cult title

People with the surname
 Klaus Sator (born 1956), German historian
 László Sátor (born 1953), Hungarian racewalker
 Ted Sator (born 1949), American ice hockey coach

Entertainment
 Sator (film), a 2020 American supernatural horror film
 Sator (band), a Swedish band
 Andrei Sator, a character from the film Tenet